This is a list of gliders/sailplanes of the world, (this reference lists all gliders with references, where available) 
Note: Any aircraft can glide for a short time, but gliders are designed to glide for longer.

Chinese gliders 
(X-Xianji – glider)
 Jie-Fang 1 
 Shenyang HU-1 Seagull (Chen Kuiwen)
 Shenyang HU-2 Petrel
 Xiangji X-5A
 Chengdu X-7 Jian Fan (Xiangji X-7)
 Shenyang X-9 Jian Fan (Xiangji X-9)
 Shenyang X-10 Qian Jin (Xiangji X-10) – Shenyang Sailplane Works
 Shenyang X-11 (Xiangji X-11) – Shenyang Sailplane Works
 Guangzhou Powered J7 (Guangzhou Sport University)
 Fu-Shun 2
 Jeifang 1	(NIESPAL, J. & Chen Kuiwen & LI JIJUN)
 Jeifang 2	(JIJUN, Li & DIHUAN, Feng)
 Jeifang 3	(JIJUN, Li)
 Jeifang 5	(Chen Kuiwen)
 Jeifang 7	(DEZUNG, Shan & XINMIN, Hung)
 Jeifang 9	(DIHUAN, Feng)

Notes

Further reading

External links

Lists of glider aircraft